Reusch might refer to:

Reusch (company), a sportswear manufacturing company
Franz Heinrich Reusch (1823–1900), German theologian
Friedrich Reusch (1843–1906), German sculptor
Hans Henrik Reusch (1852–1922), Norwegian geologist
Helga Marie Ring Reusch (1865–1944), Norwegian artist
Kina Reusch (1940–1988), Canadian artist
Michael Reusch (1914-1989), Swiss gymnast
Roman Reusch (born 1954), German politician
Ron Reusch, Canadian sports broadcaster